Lakhamapura is a village in the Badami taluk of Bagalkot District in Karnataka State.

Importance
Lakhamapura is a  Middle Palaeolithic site in the Kaladgi basin. Quartzitic artefacts such as handaxes and cleavers have been excavated in Lakhamapura village.

See also
Badami
Bagalkot
Kudalasangama
Karnataka

References

AMS Maps of India and Pakistan

Villages in Bagalkot district
Archaeological sites in Karnataka